Wayne County is a county in the U.S. state of Kentucky along the southern border with Tennessee. As of the 2020 census, the population was 19,555. Its county seat is Monticello. The county, on the south-central border with Tennessee, was named for Gen. Anthony Wayne, a Revolutionary War hero. As of November 3, 2020, Wayne County is a wet countya measure allowing the sales and consumption of alcoholic drinks passed by a margin of 4,901 for and 3,966 against.

History
The first known European-American settlers to visit the area were longhunters who arrived in the 1770s. They established a temporary camp near Mill Springs on the Cumberland River. Benjamin Price built a log cabin in 1775, and Price's Station became one of the earliest Kentucky settlements. This was still an area of Cherokee homeland territory, and conflicts arose between the groups as more Americans settled here.

Many Revolutionary War veterans followed Price, including Joshua Jones, who arrived in 1794, Jonathan and James Ingram in 1796, Cornelius Phillips in 1798, and Isaac West in 1799. Veterans, they had each been given land grants in the area, in lieu of back salary payments by the United States government from the war.

Wayne County was formed December 13, 1800 from Pulaski and Cumberland counties. It was the 43rd county in the state and is named for General "Mad Anthony" Wayne, a hero of the American Revolution and the Northwest Indian War. Wayne's victory at the Battle of Fallen Timbers virtually ended the Indian threat against Kentucky settlers.

The area was developed for agriculture, and planters used enslaved African Americans as laborers. Early in the Civil War, Confederate Army General Felix Zollicoffer made his headquarters in the Brown-Lanier House at Mill Springs. He was killed at the Battle of Mill Springs on January 19, 1862, when he mistook some Union troops for his own and approached them. The Union men shot him dead, and without their leader, the Confederate were defeated.

Geography

Wayne County is located in the Pennyrile Plateau (image) and Eastern Coal Field (image) regions of Kentucky.

Adjacent counties

 Russell County - northwest/CST Border
 Pulaski County - northeast
 McCreary County - east
 Scott County, Tennessee - southeast
 Pickett County, Tennessee - south/CST Border
 Clinton County - west/CST Border

National protected area
 Daniel Boone National Forest (part)

Time zone boundary

Wayne County is on Eastern Time; however, its western border, shared with Clinton and Russell Counties, is part of the Eastern/Central time zone boundary, as is its southern border with Pickett County, TN. Wayne County observed Central time until October 2000; an account of this change is documented in an article by Dr. Stanley Brunn of the University of Kentucky.

The county has the tz database zone identifier America/Kentucky/Monticello.

Demographics

As of the census of 2000, there were 19,923 people, 7,913 households, and 5,808 families in the county. The racial makeup of the county was 96.98% White, 1.49% Black or African American, 0.18% Native American, 0.11% Asian, 0.47% from other races, and 0.78% from two or more races. 1.46% of the population were Hispanic or Latino any race.

There were 7,913 households, out of which 33.40% had children under the age of 18 living with them, 58.90% were married couples living together, 10.60% had a female householder with no husband present, and 26.60% were non-families. 23.90% of all households were made up of individuals, and 10.40% had someone living alone who was 65 years of age or older.  The average household size was 2.49 and the average family size was 2.94.

The county population contained 25.30% under the age of 18, 8.90% from 18 to 24, 28.10% from 25 to 44, 24.00% from 45 to 64, and 13.60% who were 65 years of age or older. The median age was 37 years. For every 100 females there were 97.80 males. For every 100 females age 18 and over, there were 94.90 males.

The median income for a household in the county was $20,863, and the median income for a family was $24,869. Males had a median income of $24,021 versus $18,102 for females. The per capita income for the county was $12,601. About 24.60% of families and 29.40% of the population were below the poverty line, including 34.90% of those under age 18 and 31.50% of those over age 64.

Notable people
 Polly Berry, an enslaved woman in St. Louis, Missouri, who gained freedom for both herself and her daughter through two freedom suits in court. She had lived as a child in Wayne County before her master took her to Illinois (a free state) and Missouri. 
 Lettice Bryan, author of The Kentucky Housewife (1839), a popular cookbook, lived in Wayne County in the 1830s and 1840s when her cookbook was published.
 Shelby M. Cullom (1829-1914), Governor of Illinois (1877-1883); U. S. Senator (1883-1913)
 Preston H. Leslie (1819-1907) - Governor of Kentucky (1871-1875); Governor of Montana (1887-1889)
 Harriette Simpson Arnow (1908 - 1986) was an American novelist and historian, who was born in Monticello, Wayne County, Kentucky.  
 Hal Rogers, US Congressman (1981-present)
 Kenny Davis, US Olympic basketball player (1972)

Tourist attractions
 William Crenshaw Kennedy, Jr. Memorial Museum and Genealogy Library
 The Quilte Shoppe, 24 North Main, and Linda's Quilt Shop, 627 Michigan Avenue, both in Monticello
 Doughboy Monument, located on the Monticello town square, in honor of World War I soldiers
 Conley Bottom Resort and Marina on Lake Cumberland
 Mill Springs Mill (1877) and Park, a water-powered overshot gristmill that is still operating 
 Brown-Lanier House - Historic home associated with the Civil War Battle of Mill Springs/Logan's Crossroads

Politics

Communities

 Alpha
 Barrier
 Big Sinking
 Cooper
 Duncan Valley
 Fall Creek
 Frazer
 Frisby
 Hidalgo
 Mill Springs
 Monticello (county seat)
 Parmleysville
 Powersburg
 Rockybranch
 Roger's Grove
 Steubenville
 Sunnybrook
 Windy

Education
Wayne County Schools operates the county's public schools.

On June 30, 2013 Monticello Independent Schools merged into Wayne County schools.

Vocational education in the county has been provided by Wayne County Vocational School from 1971 to the present. Its name has changed several times during that period; it is presently knows as Wayne County Area Technology Center (ATC). It is managed by The Office Of Career And Technical Education. The school serves secondary students enrolled in Wayne County High School. Programs include Health Science, Welding, Carpentry, Machine Tool, Automotive, Industrial Maintenance, and Business.

See also

 National Register of Historic Places listings in Wayne County, Kentucky
 Ken Upchurch - member of the Kentucky House of Representatives from Wayne County

References

External links
 Wayne County History
 Wayne County Historical Museum
 Battle of Mill Springs
 Wayne County KYGenWeb Site
 City of Monticello, Kentucky Website
 Monticello/Wayne County Chamber of Commerce
 My Kentucky World (Harlan Ogle)
 Monticello Independent School
 Wayne County School District

 
Kentucky counties
Counties of Appalachia
1800 establishments in Kentucky
Populated places established in 1800